On the Floor at the Boutique – Volume 2 is a DJ mix by the Lo Fidelity Allstars released as a compilation album in 2000. It was recorded at the Big Beat Boutique in 1999 in Brighton, England.

Track listing
 "You're Never Alone with a Clone" / "No Diggity" by Lo Fidelity Allstars and Blackstreet – 5:44
 "Stand Clear" by Indian Ropeman – 2:36
 "Pump Me Up" by Trouble Funk – 2:03
 "You Must Learn (Live from Caucus Mountain Remix)" by Boogie Down Productions – 4:56
 "Levitation" by Runaways – 2:27
 "Raw Element" by Dirt – 4:10
 "Darn (Cold Way o' Lovin')" by Super_Collider – 2:42
 "What Is It?" by Wildstyle Bob Nimble – 1:26
 "Black Is Black (Ultimatum Mix)" by Jungle Brothers – 2:36
 "(Hey You) What That Sound?" by Les Rythmes Digitales – 1:26
 "(I Need The) Disko Doktor" by Space Raiders – 1:49
 "Stakker Humanoid" by Humanoid – 3:32
 "20 Seconds to Comply" by Silver Bullet – 5:02
 "The Funk Phenomena (Johnickennydope Mastermix)" by Armand Van Helden – 3:31
 "Makin' It Happen" by Jackson & His Computer Band – 4:59
 "Many Tentacles Pimping on the Keys" by Lo Fidelity Allstars – 5:33
 "The Whole Church Should Get Drunk" by The Feelgood Factor – 6:26
 "I Can Feel Your Love" by Felice Taylor – 2:51
 "Be Young, Be Foolish, Be Happy" by The Tams – 2:13
 "Out of Space" by The Prodigy – 4:47
 "Bootsy Call" by Lo Fidelity Allstars – 0:48

References

2000 live albums
Lo Fidelity Allstars albums
Skint Records albums